Dana Marie Perino (born May 9, 1972) is an American political commentator and author who served as the 26th White House Press Secretary, under President George W. Bush from September 14, 2007, to January 20, 2009. She was the second female White House Press Secretary, after Dee Dee Myers, who served during the Clinton administration.

Perino is a political commentator for Fox News, while also serving as a co-host of the network's talk show The Five, and was a book publishing executive at Random House. On October 2, 2017, she began hosting The Daily Briefing with Dana Perino on Fox News.  In early 2021, Perino left The Daily Briefing to co-anchor America's Newsroom with Bill Hemmer.

Early life and career
Born in Evanston, Wyoming on May 9, 1972, she grew up in Denver, Colorado. Two of her paternal great-grandparents were Italian immigrants. She attended Ponderosa High School in Parker, a suburb southeast of Denver. Perino graduated from Colorado State University Pueblo with a bachelor's degree in mass communications and minors in both political science and Spanish. She was on the university's forensics team and worked at KTSC-TV, the campus-based Rocky Mountain PBS affiliate. She also worked at KCCY-FM on the 2 to 6 a.m. shift. Perino went on to obtain a master's degree in public affairs reporting from the University of Illinois Springfield (UIS). During her time at UIS, she also worked for WCIA, a CBS affiliate, as a daily reporter covering the Illinois Capitol.

Perino next worked in Washington, D.C. for Congressman Scott McInnis (R-CO) as a staff assistant before serving nearly four years as the press secretary for Rep. Dan Schaefer (R-CO), who then chaired the House Commerce Subcommittee on Energy and Power.

After Schaefer announced his retirement in 1998, Perino and husband Peter McMahon moved to Great Britain.

In November 2001, Perino returned to Washington, D.C., and secured a position as a spokesperson for the Department of Justice, at which she served for two years.

Perino then joined the White House staff as the associate director of communications for the White House Council on Environmental Quality (CEQ), where she provided strategic advice on message development, media relations and public outreach. The House Oversight Committee, chaired by Rep. Edolphus Towns (D-NY),  claimed in its findings on climate change censorship, that the CEQ exerted undue control of media relations in governmental scientific agencies during her tenure.

Press secretary

Perino was hired by White House chief of staff Andy Card two months after the September 11 attacks. Initially, she was associate director of communications for the White House CEQ in 2002.

Perino served as Deputy Press Secretary from 2005 to 2007. From March 27 through April 30, 2007, she was the Acting White House Press Secretary while Tony Snow underwent treatment for colon cancer.

On August 31, 2007, President George W. Bush announced that Snow would be resigning his post for health reasons and that Perino would become his replacement. Perino served as Assistant to the President and as White House Press Secretary from September 14, 2007, until the end of the Bush administration in January 2009.

On December 14, 2008, a TV journalist, Muntadhar al-Zaidi, threw two shoes at Bush during a Baghdad press conference. Bush successfully dodged both, but Perino's eye was injured by a microphone stand during the commotion surrounding al-Zaidi's arrest.

Post-Bush administration career

Since leaving the White House, Perino became a political commentator on Fox News. She is a regular co-host on the talk show, The Five. In November 2009, she was nominated by President Barack Obama to serve on the Broadcasting Board of Governors, an agency overseeing government-sponsored international broadcasting, and was confirmed by the Senate on June 30, 2010. In 2010, she started teaching a class in political communications part-time at George Washington University's Graduate School of Political Management. In March 2011 the Crown Publishing Group, a division of Random House, Inc., announced that Perino had joined its books imprint Crown Forum as Editorial Director but she has since left this position.

Beginning September 18, 2016, Perino's podcast Perino & Stirewalt: I'll Tell You What, co-hosted with Chris Stirewalt, premiered as a weekly limited series on the Fox News Channel. A new show was released weekly until Stirewalt's firing from the network after the 2020 Presidential Election.

Personal life
Perino met her future husband, English-born Peter McMahon, in August 1997. They were married in 1998.
In May 2012, Perino appeared on Jeopardy! during its "Power Players" week, facing Kareem Abdul-Jabbar and CNBC's David Faber.

Perino has been a resident of Bay Head, New Jersey.
Dana is also known for her dog Jasper, a Vizsla. Jasper died on September 4, 2021. A few months later, Dana announced on the Fox News Channel that she and her husband Peter adopted another Vizsla named Percy.

See also
 New Yorkers in journalism

Bibliography

References

External links

 Fox News profile
 
 

1972 births
Living people
21st-century American journalists
American people of Italian descent
American political commentators
Colorado Republicans
Colorado State University Pueblo alumni
Conservatism in the United States
Fox News people
George W. Bush administration personnel
People from Bay Head, New Jersey
People from Denver
People from Evanston, Wyoming
People from Parker, Colorado
University of Illinois at Springfield alumni
White House Press Secretaries
Wyoming Republicans